The Oyster Bay Branch is a rail line and service owned and operated by the Long Island Rail Road in the U.S. state of New York. The branch splits from the Main Line just east of Mineola station, and runs north and east to Oyster Bay. The branch is electrified between East Williston and Mineola. The branch opened in segments between 1865 and 1889.

History

Early history

The first phase of what is now known as the Oyster Bay Branch opened on January 23, 1865. The line was built by the Glen Cove Branch Rail Road, a subsidiary of the Long Island Rail Road (LIRR), which was incorporated on December 3, 1858.

The line was built as a branch of the LIRR's Main Line from Mineola, and extended to Glen Head. On May 16, 1867 the railway was extended to Glen Cove (now known as Glen Street). and on April 19, 1869 the line was extended further to Locust Valley.

By the early 1880s, there had been pressure to expand rail service eastward. At this time another railroad, the Northern Railroad of Long Island threatened the Long island Rail Road's monopoly. The Northern Railroad was incorporated on March 23, 1881, and it planned to build a road from Astoria to Northport via Flushing, Great Neck, Glen Cove, Oyster Bay and Huntington. By June 1881, construction plans were authorized and in mid-July the building contract was signed, with work set to begin in August. The Long Island Rail Road attempted to undermine the Northern Railroad's project before it could sell stock and acquire a roadbed. It was going to link its north side branches together as a continuous railroad to Northport. Construction cost from Great Neck to Roslyn and from Locust Valley to Northport was approximately $400,000.

In February 1883, Austin Corbin, president of the Long Island Rail Road, offered to supply iron and rolling stock for the extension to Oyster Bay if local residents provided the right-of-way.  While citizens considered the offer, the Northern Railroad folded since not enough money was raised. With the threat eliminated, the extension of rail service to Oyster Bay was temporarily delayed. The project was revived in 1886 when some citizens offered to secure a right-of-way. In June 1886, a public meeting was held and a committee of 15 was appointed to secure land. Although officials were still contemplating a through line to Northport, the LIRR organized the Oyster Bay Extension Railroad on August 31, 1886, which authorized a five-mile road from Locust Valley to Oyster Bay. Ground was broken for the project on August 15, 1887. One phase of construction was the building of a bridge over what is now Tunnel Street in Locust Valley. The masonry project began in October 1888 and the arch was finished on April 13, 1889. The entire bridge was completed by September.

On June 24, 1889, the extension opened with a huge celebration in Oyster Bay. A ceremonial train of ten cars left Long Island City about 9:30 a.m. and was met at Locust Valley by ten young ladies who decorated the locomotive with flags and wreaths. Upon arrival at Oyster Bay, an organized procession commenced, which was viewed by 5,000 residents and visitors. On Tuesday, June 25, the extension opened for regular passenger service with eight round trips daily to and from Long Island City.

The line ended at Locust Valley for two decades until a final extension added four miles (6.4 Kilometers) to Oyster Bay. One of the reasons for building to Oyster Bay was to create a connection to New England. A large pier, now owned by the Flowers Oyster Company, was built to facilitate the loading of passenger cars onto a ferry, specifically to the Danbury and Norwalk Railroad station and ferry pier in Wilson's Point section of Norwalk, Connecticut. Service lasted only a few years as overland service from New York to Boston, once thought impossible, commenced.

In early 1892, a second track was built between Mineola and Albertson.

20th century to present
The line was double-tracked to Roslyn, Glen Cove and Locust Valley in 1905, 1909 and 1911, respectively. The extension of the line's second track was done in anticipation of electrification.

Until 1928, a direct connection to the West Hempstead Branch existed just east of Mineola station. This spur crossed the Main Line, then terminated at the end of a wye at what was often called the Garden City Branch. Until passenger service was abandoned along this branch, passengers would transfer between the two lines at Mineola Station itself.

In November 1928, LIRR officials surveyed the branch to evaluate the feasibility of electrifying the line. The Glen Cove Chamber of Commerce petitioned the LIRR, advocating for electrification. In response, the Vice President of the LIRR, in December, stated that the LIRR had to deal with the completion of multiple grade crossing elimination projects before electrifying the Oyster Bay Branch, which was estimated to cost $3.28 million.

By June 1934, the section of the line between East Williston and Mineola was electrified, with the remainder of the branch expected to be electrified soon after. However, the remainder of the work was not completed; as a result, the branch is served by diesel powered-locomotive trains, though, until 2023, one AM peak train that originated at East Williston and ended at Penn Station utilized electric multiple units. Mill Neck station closed in 1998.

In 2009, the LIRR replaced the bridge over West Shore Road between Locust Valley and Oyster Bay Stations. In the late 2010s, the LIRR replaced and raised the bridge over Buckram Road between Locust Valley and Oyster Bay Stations.

In April 2021, then-President Phillip Eng announced that the LIRR entered into an agreement with Alstom to test battery-powered train cars along the Oyster Bay Branch. The branch was chosen due to the short 13-mile trip between East Williston and Oyster Bay. The project had the potential to improve service along the branch and across the LIRR's remaining diesel territory. However, after spending $850,000 on the project, in July 2022 the LIRR announced that retrofitting existing trains with the technology was proven to be unfeasible, but the technology could be added to future train cars. Environmental groups continue to pressure the state to include LIRR electrification in their plan to become carbon neutral by 2050.

Stations

References

External links

 Oyster Bay Branch Stations (Unofficial LIRR History web site)
 NYCSubway.org: Oyster Bay Branch
 Oyster Bay Branch (The LIRR Today)

Long Island Rail Road branches
Transportation in Nassau County, New York